Group F of the 2017 Africa Cup of Nations qualification tournament was one of the thirteen groups to decide the teams which qualified for the 2017 Africa Cup of Nations finals tournament. The group consisted of four teams: Cape Verde, Morocco, Libya, and São Tomé and Príncipe.

The teams played against each other home-and-away in a round-robin format, between June 2015 and September 2016.

Morocco, the group winners, qualified for the 2017 Africa Cup of Nations.

Standings

Matches

Goalscorers
4 goals

 Youssef El-Arabi

3 goals

 Mohamed Zubya

2 goals

 Djaniny
 Nabil Dirar
 Luís Leal

1 goal

 Babanco
 Odaïr Fortes
 Ricardo Gomes
 Kay
 Ryan Mendes
 Nuno Jóia
 Nuno Rocha
 Garry Rodrigues
 Júlio Tavares
 Faisal Al Badri
 Sanad Al Ouarfali
 Fouad Al Triki
 Mohamed El Monir
 Ali Elmusrati
 Nordin Amrabat
 Aziz Bouhaddouz
 Omar El Kaddouri
 Hakim Ziyech
 Faduley 

1 own goal
 Ahmed El Trbi

Notes

References

External links
Orange Africa Cup Of Nations Qualifiers 2017, CAFonline.com

Group F